Boccia competitions at the 2019 Parapan American Games in Lima were held from August 29 to September 1 at the Polideportivo Villa El Salvador. All Boccia competitions were mixed (men and women competed together equally).

Medal table

Medalists

References

2019 Parapan American Games
Boccia competitions